Hoseynabad-e Kalali (also Romanized as Ḩoseynābād-e Kalālī) is a village in Gol Banu Rural District, Pain Jam District, Torbat-e Jam County, Razavi Khorasan Province, Iran. At the 2006 census, its population was 460, in 102 families.

References 

Populated places in Torbat-e Jam County